The 2021 ABN AMRO World Tennis Tournament (or Rotterdam Open) is a men's tennis tournament played on indoor hard courts. It is taking place at the Rotterdam Ahoy arena in the Dutch city of Rotterdam, between 1 and 7 March 2021. It is the 48th edition of the Rotterdam Open, and part of the ATP Tour 500 series on the 2021 ATP Tour. The tournament also included a Men's Wheelchair Tennis Singles and Doubles draw.

Finals

Singles 

  Andrey Rublev def.  Márton Fucsovics, 7–6(7–4), 6–4

Doubles 

  Nikola Mektić /  Mate Pavić def.  Kevin Krawietz /  Horia Tecău, 7–6(9–7), 6–2

Points and prize money

Point distribution

Prize money 

*per team

Singles main-draw entrants

Seeds

Other entrants 
The following players received wildcards into the main draw:
  Robin Haase
  Andy Murray 
  Botic van de Zandschulp
  Alexander Zverev

The following players received entry as Special Exempt into the main draw:
  Egor Gerasimov

The following players received entry from the qualifying draw:
  Jérémy Chardy
  Márton Fucsovics
  Marcos Giron
  Cameron Norrie

Withdrawals 
  Matteo Berrettini → replaced by  Adrian Mannarino
  Pablo Carreño Busta → replaced by  Lorenzo Sonego
  Dan Evans → replaced by  Nikoloz Basilashvili
  Taylor Fritz → replaced by  Tommy Paul
  Filip Krajinović → replaced by  Alejandro Davidovich Fokina
  Gaël Monfils → replaced by  Kei Nishikori
  Rafael Nadal → replaced by  Reilly Opelka
  Milos Raonic → replaced by  Alexander Bublik
  Casper Ruud → replaced by  John Millman
  Denis Shapovalov → replaced by  Jan-Lennard Struff

Doubles main-draw entrants

Seeds 

1 Rankings as of February 22, 2021.

Other entrants 
The following pairs received wildcards into the doubles main draw:
  Robin Haase /  Matwé Middelkoop
  Petros Tsitsipas /  Stefanos Tsitsipas

The following pair received entry from the qualifying draw:
  Sander Arends /  David Pel

Withdrawals 
Before the tournament
  Ivan Dodig /  Filip Polášek → replaced by  Ben McLachlan /  Kei Nishikori
  Rajeev Ram /  Joe Salisbury → replaced by  Sander Gillé /  Joran Vliegen
  Jannik Sinner /  Stan Wawrinka → replaced by  Dušan Lajović /  Stan Wawrinka
  Pierre-Hugues Herbert /  Nicolas Mahut → replaced by  Pierre-Hugues Herbert /  Jan-Lennard Struff

References

External links 
 

ABN AMRO World Tennis Tournament
ABN AMRO World Tennis Tournament
ABN Amro World Tennis